Ákos is a Hungarian name. Today, it is mainly a masculine given name.

It may refer to:

Middle Ages 
 Ákos (clan), a medieval Hungarian clan
 Ákos (chronicler) (d. after 1273)
 Ernye Ákos (d. after 1275)

Given name 
 Ákos Buzsáky, Hungarian footballer
 Ákos Császár, Hungarian mathematician
 Ákos Elek, Hungarian footballer
 Ákos Kovács (radiologist), Hungarian radiologist
 Ákos Kovács (singer), Hungarian singer
 Ákos Ráthonyi, film director and screenwriter
 Ákos Vereckei, sprint canoe racer

See also 
 Ákos, the Hungarian name for Acâș, a commune in Satu Mare County, Romania
 Ákosfalva, the Hungarian name for Acățari, a commune in Mureș County, Romania

Hungarian masculine given names